Rockbridge Baths is an unincorporated community in Rockbridge County, Virginia, United States.

Notable residents
Jean Hélion, French painter
Rick Mast, NASCAR driver
Henry C. Schadeberg, politician

References

Unincorporated communities in Rockbridge County, Virginia
Unincorporated communities in Virginia